The firethroat (Calliope pectardens) also known as David's rubythroat or Père David's orangethroat is a species of passerine bird in the family Muscicapidae, found in western and central parts of China.  It breeds in Sichuan, China, and winters primarily in the Indian subcontinent.  Its wintering range spans across Bangladesh, Bhutan, India, Nepal, Tibet and Myanmar.  Its natural habitat is temperate forests.
It is threatened by habitat loss.

The first formal description of the firethroat was by the Catholic priest and zoologist Armand David in 1877 who coined the current binomial name Calliope pectardens. The species was later placed in the genus Luscinia but when a molecular phylogenetic study published in 2010 found that Luscinia was not monophyletic the genus was split and several species including the firethroat were moved to the reinstated genus Calliope. Calliope, from classical Greek meaning beautiful-voiced, was one of the muses in Greek mythology. The specific name pectardens is from the Latin pectus for "breast" and ardens meaning "fiery" or "glowing".

References

External links
Xeno-canto: audio recordings of the firethroat

Calliope (genus)
Birds of Central China
Birds of Tibet
Birds of Yunnan
Birds described in 1877
Taxonomy articles created by Polbot